The Xian MA60 (新舟60, Xīnzhōu liùshí, "Modern Ark 60") is a turboprop-powered airliner produced by China's Xi'an Aircraft Industrial Corporation under the Aviation Industry Corporation of China (AVIC). The MA60 is a stretched version of the Xian Y7-200A, which was produced based on the An-24 to operate in rugged conditions with limited ground support and has short take-off and landing (STOL) capability.

The airplane received its type certificate from the Civil Aviation Administration of China in June 2000. The MA60 has not applied for FAA (US) and EASA (Europe) type certification, and is not certified for use in the European Union or the US. The general designer of MA-60 series is Lü Hai (吕海).

As of October 2006, XAC has received over 90 MA60 orders. The factory had delivered 23 MA60s by the end of 2006, and expects to deliver an additional 165 by the end of 2016.

Variants

 Xian MA60-100: Reduced weight improved performance.
 Xian MA60-MPA Fearless Albatross: Maritime patrol and ASW variant offered for sale at Airshow China 2002.
 Xian MA40: Reduced capacity 40-seat variant offered for sale in 2002.
 Xian MA60H-500: A military cargo version of the MA-60, with rear cargo ramp.
 Xian MA600: A much improved MA60, the prototype of which was completed on 29 June 2008.

Operators

Civil 
"The aircraft is popular with air charter companies and small feeder airlines, and is operated by private individuals and companies

 
 Joy Air

Government 

 
 National Air Force of Angola
 
 Royal Cambodian Air Force 
 
 Cameroon Air Force 
 
 Civil Aviation Flight University of China 
 China Meteorological Administration
People's Liberation Army Air Force
 
 Djibouti Air Force
 
  Laotian Army Air Force 
 
 Zambian Air Force

Accidents and incidents

As of 13 November 2015, there had been 14 accidents involving the MA60. One accident was fatal (MZ8968) resulting in 21 passenger and 4 crew deaths. This caused New Zealand to suspend tourism aid to Tonga, and warned tourists about flying the aircraft which had been donated to the country.
 On 11 January 2009, an MA60 operated by Philippine carrier Zest Airways crashed at Caticlan Airport when it landed too short on the runway, skidded out of control and crashed into a concrete barrier. The aircraft caught fire and suffered extensive damage to its wing, landing gear, undercarriage and one engine. Several passengers were injured.
 In June 2009, an MA60 operated by Zest overshot the runway while trying to land at Caticlan airport. As a consequence of this accident lengthening of the runway and the flattening of a hill that obstructs one of its approaches was carried out.
 On 7 May 2011 Merpati Nusantara Airlines Flight 8968 (with Indonesian registration PK-MZK) went into sea only 500 metres from the runway in bad weather with poor visibility on visual approach to Kaimana Airport, Kaimana, West Papua in Indonesia. It had left Sorong Airport with 19 passengers and 6 crew members on board. All passengers and crew were killed, making this the first reported fatal accident for the Xian MA60.  On 24 August 2011 Indonesia's Transportation Minister determined human error was to blame for the disaster.
 On 9 January 2012 a TAM flight from Riberalta Airport to Guayaramerín Airport, Bolivia operated by FAB-96 landed with the undercarriage not deployed due to a fault, resulting in substantial damage to the aircraft. There were no injuries amongst the five crew and sixteen passengers.
 On 16 May 2013 a Myanma Airways flight from Heho Airport to Monghsat Airport in Myanmar overran the runway on landing, resulting in two serious injuries and substantial damage to the aircraft. The MA60 allegedly suffered a brakes failure.
 On 10 June 2013 Merpati Nusantara Airlines Flight 6517 (with Indonesian registration PK-MZO) from Bajawa to Kupang, with 50 people on board landed hard at Kupang airport in East Nusa Tenggara, Indonesia. Twenty-five people were injured. The plane, which had been damaged beyond repair, lay on its belly on the runway with its engines jammed face down into the tarmac and its wings bent forward. Indonesian National Transportation Safety Committee (NTSC) has released preliminary report on this accident. The preliminary report consists of factual information collected until the preliminary report published without analysis and conclusion.
 On 10 June 2013 Myanma Airways flight UB309 from Mawlamyine, Myanmar, carrying four crew members and 60 passengers swerved off the runway upon landing at Kawthaung. The plane came to a stop in bushes about 60 metres to the west of the runway, with smoke coming from the left side propeller housing and the propellers on both wings damaged. There were no injuries. It is possible the captain was too early in switching the nosewheel steering to the 'taxi' mode during the landing roll and lost directional control. A similar incident occurred in December 2011.
 On 4 February 2014 Joy Air flight JR1533 from Taiyuan, China, carrying 7 crew members and 37 passengers, had a mechanical failure on the landing gear while landing at Zhengzhou. This caused landing gear to break and the aircraft's nose cone to hit the tarmac. There were no injuries.
 On 10 May 2015, Joy Air flight JR1529 from Yiwu to Fuzhou with 45 passengers and 7 crew landed on Fuzhou runway 3 at about 11:57 but veered off the runway and came to a stop off the runway edge about 500 metres past the runway threshold and about 50 metres off the runway centerline with all gear on soft ground. The engines struck the ground causing the wings to be nearly torn off, and resulted in substantial damage to the fuselage and structure. 7 occupants were injured.
 On November 13, 2015 Lao Skyway flight LLL 265 overshot the runway.

Operational problems

The New Zealand Government suspended its programme of development aid to Tonga's tourism industry in July 2013 after an MA60 donated by the Chinese Government was delivered to the airline Real Tonga. In August 2013 the New Zealand Government also issued a statement advising tourists to not travel on Real Tonga's MA60 on the grounds that "this aircraft has been involved in a significant number of accidents in the last few years", and the type "is not certified to fly in New Zealand or other comparable jurisdictions". Real Tonga ceased operating the MA60 in early 2015 after the Tongan Government passed legislation adopting New Zealand's civil aviation regulations. A proposal to re-establish Royal Tongan Airlines to operate the MA60 was reported later in the year.

Of the 57 MA60s exported by January 2016, at least 26 were in storage after safety concerns, maintenance problems or performance issues; six others were damaged beyond repair.

On 26 March 2019 the Cameroon Civil Aviation Authority (CCAA) suspended the airworthiness certificate of the MA60 following a tail strike accident. The aircraft was allowed to operate again one day later.

In August 2020, Nepal Airlines grounded its fleet of 2 MA60s due to their sub-standard performance and high operating costs. The aircraft had been acquired in 2012 and as per a Nepal Airlines board member, "The 2012 decision to buy the aircraft was prompted by greed for commissions. The Nepali experts submitted a fabricated report. The Y12E was compared with the Twin Otter, and the MA60 was compared with the ATR 72. Nepal Airlines is paying the price now".

Specifications (MA60)

See also

References

 Jackson, Paul. Jane's All The World's Aircraft 2003–2004. Coulsdon, UK: Jane's Information Group, 2003. .

External links

 MA60 Homepage
 MA60 aircraft promotion videos and intro
 China Economic net article
 People's Daily description

1990s Chinese airliners
MA60
Aircraft first flown in 2000
Twin-turboprop tractor aircraft